Thomas Payne (born 21 December 1982) is an English actor. He is known for appearing on AMC's The Walking Dead as Paul "Jesus" Rovia, and BBC's Waterloo Road as Brett Aspinall. He portrayed Malcolm Bright on the American television series Prodigal Son from 2019 to 2021.

Early life 
Payne was born in Chelmsford, Essex, and grew up in Bath, Somerset, where he attended King Edward's School and was a prolific contributor to the school's drama department. He attended the Royal Central School of Speech & Drama, graduating in June 2005. He then appeared in Miss Pettigrew Lives for a Day.

Career
In January 2007, he first appeared in Waterloo Road for the BBC, playing sixth former Brett Aspinall. Despite being 24 at the time, Payne portrayed a 17-year-old character. He remained in the series until the end of the following season in March 2008. It was revealed afterwards that he would not be returning for the new season, beginning in January 2009.

In 2009, Payne played George Best in Best: His Mother's Son, a BBC2 film about the legendary footballer. In the same year he appeared in Marple: They Do It With Mirrors and Wuthering Heights for ITV.

Payne was named one of Screen International's Stars of Tomorrow in 2007.

On 8 March 2010, it was announced that Tom had joined the cast of Luck a new pilot for HBO directed by Michael Mann, written by David Milch, starring Dustin Hoffman and Nick Nolte. He plays the role of a Cajun jockey.

In 2012, he was cast in the title role of The Physician (based on the book of the same name) alongside Stellan Skarsgård and Ben Kingsley.

Payne was cast with a recurring role in Season 6 of The Walking Dead, as Paul "Jesus" Rovia, and promoted to series regular for season 7. Tom remained for two further seasons until his character was killed off in season nine.

In 2019, Payne was cast in the lead role as a serial killer's son in the Fox police procedural series Prodigal Son.

Personal life
Payne began dating singer Jennifer Åkerman in late 2013. He announced on an episode of Talking Dead that they had become engaged. Åkerman later revealed on her Instagram that they married in December 2020 after postponing their wedding due to COVID-19.

His younger brother Will Payne is also an actor.

Filmography

Film

Television

References

External links

 

Living people
1982 births
21st-century English male actors
Alumni of the Royal Central School of Speech and Drama
English male film actors
English male stage actors
English male television actors
Male actors from Essex
Male actors from Somerset
People educated at King Edward's School, Bath
People from Bath, Somerset
Actors from Chelmsford